White caps were groups involved in whitecapping who were operating in southern Indiana in the late 19th century. They engaged in vigilante justice and lynchings. In modern times, they are often viewed as engaging in terrorism. They became common in the state following the American Civil War and lasted until the turn of the 20th century. White caps were  especially active in  Crawford and neighboring counties in the late 1880s. Several members of the Reno Gang  were lynched in 1868, causing an international incident. Some of the members had been extradited to the United States from Canada and were supposed to be under federal protection. Lynchings continued against other criminals, but when two possibly innocent men were killed in Corydon in 1889, Indiana responded by cracking down on the white cap vigilante groups, beginning in the administration of Isaac P. Gray.

Governor of Indiana James A. Mount belonged to one of the white cap groups, and reversed state policy of trying to stop the groups. His successor, Winfield T. Durbin, resumed the policy in 1900, two years after the Indiana General Assembly passed a strong anti-lynching law. When a lynching occurred in Vincennes in 1902 Durbin removed several law enforcement personnel from their positions, to show that he expected locals to cooperate in stopping the lynching.  His plan worked, and when a lynching was threatened in the following year local police notified Durbin who called out the state militia to guard the jailhouse. When the white cap groups attacked the jailhouse, the militia opened fire; killing one and wounding at least eleven.

The show of force effectively brought an end to vigilante lynching in Indiana. Only two recorded lynchings have occurred since then, the 1930 murders of Thomas Shipp and Abram Smith. Lynching in Indiana was not explicitly racial, but tended to occur against anyone suspected of murder. Between 1860 and 1910, at least 68 people were lynched; twenty were blacks and forty-eight were whites.

Early white cap activity

Reno Gang lynching

In the years following the American Civil War, southern Indiana experienced several high-profile criminal events. The Reno Gang began to terrorize the region in the immediate years after the war, becoming the first gang in the nation to begin robbing trains. They sacked rural towns, murdered and robbed travelers, and carried out numerous acts of indiscriminate violence against people. The state police were unable to bring the group under control, but the Pinkerton Agency was hired by one of the robbed train companies to pursue and capture the group. It took a year for the Pinkertons to capture the gang leaders and the townspeople had already grown wary of the gang and had formed the "Jackson County Committee of Vigilance" in 1868, one of the first of the white cap groups in Indiana. Most likely made of up Civil War veterans, they attacked the jail where the men were held and lynched three of them. Four more gang members were captured in Canada and were extradited to the United States. The same group of hooded men traveled by night, marching in formation as they attacked the New Albany jail where the prisoners were held, wounding the county sheriff, and lynching the men.

Their murders caused an international incident with Great Britain, who demanded to know why they had not been adequately protected and threatened to cancel their extradition treaty with the United States. Given the severity of the gang's crimes, and the near certainty they would have suffered the same fate after a trial, the state government did not take any action against the white cap group.

Moral police

White caps groups began to spring up across the state over the next decade. By the mid-1870s,  there were numerous such groups like the State Horse Thief Detective Association, which carried out vigilante justice against horse thieves. The groups operated in secret, and had an element of masonic influence in their organization. The groups were most prevalent in the southern part of Indiana, and especially so in Harrison and Crawford Counties. Many of the groups started as enforcers of morality. They were known to target alcoholics, people believed to be idle, and men who did not provide for their families. Such people were often abducted and flogged.

They soon began to target women who were not believed to be adequately caring for their home and children, children who were truant from school, and people who shirked from civic duty like working on road projects. By the late 1870s, the groups were beginning to target criminals for punishment, and continued to carry out sporadic lynchings.

State crackdown

Early measures

The June 13, 1889, lynching of two men in Corydon sparked an outcry for something to be done about the vigilantes.  A mob of 150 mounted men, led by twenty masked white caps, arrived at the county jail and demanded the release into their custody of two men (James Devin and Charles Tennyson) being held on charges of attempted murder. The leaders of the group demanded the keys to the jail, threatening to burn down the town if they were refused; after the sheriff refused to hand over the keys, the mob used hammers to knock down the jail doors and removed the two alleged assailants. The two men were dragged to the old Western Bridge, where they were hanged. The guilt of the men was not widely accepted, and many believed they had been killed unfairly and deserved a trial.

In 1889, Governor of Indiana Isaac P. Gray was the first to begin attempting to put an end to the white cap's activities. He did so primarily by offering increased police support to local officials in southern Indiana. The measure proved ineffective though, because many of the local sheriffs were themselves members of the organizations and turned a blind eye to the activity. Governor Alvin Hovey, an American Civil War general who had campaigned in part on the white cap problem, was the next governor to combat them.  He continued his predecessor's attempt to have local law enforcement play a role in stopping the white caps, but ratcheted up the rhetoric by making threats to remove local law enforcement from office and declare martial law in towns where lynchings occurred. His threats were somewhat successful, and only two lynchings occurred during his term.

Governor Claude Matthews took another step in dealing with the groups, primarily by attempting to identify and prosecute leaders of the groups. His attempts were mostly unsuccessful in capturing anyone of merit, but did add another level of suppression to the groups. When James A. Mount came to office though, he stopped most of the anti-white cap policies. He himself had been a member of one such organization. During his term, the groups became increasingly active, leading to numerous incidents of vigilante justice and a rise in lynchings. The Indiana General Assembly attempted to force the governor to action by passing a law in 1898 that required local sheriffs to petition the governor for support in the event of a threatened lynching. They also authorized the governor to call out the militia to protect prisoners, and granted him the power to remove local officials from office if they did not notify him of a threatened act of violence. Despite the law, Mount took no action against the groups during his term.

Confrontation

Winfield T. Durbin succeeded Mount in 1900 and began a vigorous campaign to put an end to the white caps. In 1902, he invoked the new anti-lynching law after a lynching in Vincennes. He removed from office numerous law enforcement officials and put the militia on patrol, and launched a host of investigations into local government.

In 1903, a police officer was killed in Evansville following a dispute between two black men at a bar. The sheriff, fearing the same fate as the sheriff in nearby Vincennes, sent word to the governor requesting assistance in protecting the suspect, Lee Brown, in custody. Durbin quickly dispatched a company of militia to protect the jailhouse from any potential danger. A mob of hooded white caps soon surrounded the jailhouse and the militia and began taunting them. After several hours, the crowd began to become increasingly hostile, demanding that the militia let them past to get at the suspect. Someone in the crowd fired a shot at the soldiers, who responded by opening fire on the crowd. The militia had wounded eleven and killed one. The crowd fled and began looting and rioting in the city's black neighborhoods, an event known as the Evansville Race Riot. When the rioting subsided, many from the black community had fled the city and would not return.  The show of force also began the end of the white caps activity in the state.

Aftermath
No more lynchings would occur in Indiana for more than thirty years until the deaths of Thomas Shipp and Abram Smith in 1930. Between 1865 and 1905, at least sixty-eight people had been lynched by the white caps. In all cases, the victims had been suspected criminals, almost all of which were in state custody when they were killed. Forty-eight of the victims were whites, while twenty were blacks. Although the white cap ended their lynching and more severe forms of vigilante justice, the Indiana branch of the Ku Klux Klan began to rise in the following decade, drawing many former white caps into their numbers.

See also
Whitecapping
Indiana Klan

Notes

References
 Noble, Madeleine M. "The White Caps of Harrison and Crawford County, Indiana: A Study in the Violent Enforcement of Morality," PhD dissertation; abstract in Dissertation Abstracts International 1974, Vol. 35 Issue 1, p377-378. 

1868 establishments in Indiana
Organizations established in 1868
1903 disestablishments in Indiana
Organizations disestablished in 1903
Crimes in Indiana
History of racism in Indiana
Ku Klux Klan in Indiana
Lynching in the United States
Defunct organizations based in Indiana
Secret societies in the United States
Vigilantism in the United States